Michael James Wing (born 1960), commonly "Mike Wing", is an American author of Talking With Your Customers: What They Will Tell You About Your Business, convicted of wire fraud and implicated in other scandals, and a sports coach.

Biography

Early career 
Wing worked as a White House Fellow from 1992 to 1993 during his time at Gordon College.  In 1993, Dearborn Financial Publishing of Chicago printed his book Talking With Your Customers: What They Will Tell You About Your Business, and Arthur Andersen signed on to another printing in 1997.

U.S. Space and Rocket Center 
Wing served as executive director of the U.S. Space and Rocket Center from 1998 to 1999, where he plunged the center into debt.  Wing oversaw construction of a full-scale vertical Saturn V replica to be finished at by the 30th anniversary of the Apollo 11 moon landing, July 1999.  It serves as a towering landmark in Huntsville, and cost the center $8.6 million of borrowed money.  The Huntsville Times estimated interest costs at $10 million.  Wing also sought to create a program for fifth grade students in Alabama and elsewhere to attend Space Camp at no cost to them.  Anonymous corporate pledges that Wing promised would fund the $800 per student never arrived. Wing prolonged the Alabama Space Science Exhibit Commission's investigation into the pledges by writing bogus personal checks and having the center record them as received.  The program ultimately cost the center $7.5 million.  Wing was pressured to resign, and several members of the governing Alabama Space Science Exhibit Commission were ousted from that board as a result of the debacle.  At the end of Wing's term as director, the center was $26 million in debt.  The state sued Wing for $7.5 million over the Space Camp fraud.  They settled for $500,000.

Texas attorney 
Wing's next position was as an attorney in Tyler, Texas. He was licensed to practice in Texas from September 2000 until his resignation from the bar in February 2008. Leveraging his position as attorney and the skill and trust afforded because of same, Wing offered to his victims that they could invest in bridge loans that didn't exist. Instead of a bridge loan, he used the monies from those accounts and others to pay off prior "investors" and for his own purposes. Wing resigned from the State Bar of Texas after pleading guilty to wire fraud.

College sports coach 
Wing served as baseball coach for LeTourneau Athletics from 2002 to 2003 while the team posted 35 wins to 47 losses.

Criminal proceedings 
Wing was arrested on April 12, 2006, and charged with 18 counts of wire fraud underlying a scheme to defraud investors by offering high returns on investments for bridge loans among companies which he declined to name citing insider trading rules. He pleaded guilty to at least one count of wire fraud and was sentenced to 10 years in federal prison, 3 years of probation, and $9.2 million ($ million in current dollars) in restitution.  He was released from prison on probation in 2014.

In 2017, Wing was sentenced to 6 months in prison for a parole violation brought on by taking out loans without informing parole officers.

High school coach 
Wing took a job as coach at Ranier High School in 2016, and left that job on account of a parole violation 14 months later.

In 2019, Wing took a position as and then resigned as coach from coaching baseball at remote rural Idaho West Jefferson High School where he had pledged to raise millions for a baseball complex while having 13 players on the team.

Published works
Wing wrote the book Talking with Your Customers: What They Will Tell You about Your Business when You Ask the Right Questions published by Enterprise Dearborn in 1993.  A 1997 edition had input from Arthur Andersen and added information about the internet.

References and notes

American business writers
American businesspeople convicted of crimes
White House Fellows
20th-century American criminals
American male criminals
American people convicted of fraud
20th-century American writers
American baseball coaches
20th-century American lawyers
Texas lawyers
U.S. Space & Rocket Center
1960 births
Living people